Jhumair may refer to:

Jhumar song, folk songs of East Indian aboriginals
Jhumair, folk dance of Chotanagpur
 Jhumar, folk dance of Multan, Balochistan and Punjab

See also
Jhamar (disambiguation)